A Schnabel car or Schnabel wagon is a specialized type of railroad freight car. It is designed to carry heavy and oversized loads in such a way that the load makes up part of the car. The load is suspended between the two ends of the cars by lifting arms; the lifting arms are connected to an assembly of span bolsters that distribute the weight of the load and the lifting arm over many wheels.

When a Schnabel car is empty, the two lifting arms are connected to one another and the car can usually operate at normal freight train speeds. Some Schnabel cars include hydraulic equipment that will either lift or horizontally shift the load while in transit (at very low speeds) to clear obstructions along the car's route. As of 2012, there were 31 Schnabel cars operating in Europe, 30 in North America, 25 in Asia, and one in Australia.

Gallery

Design 

The largest Schnabel car in public railroads operation, reporting number WECX 801, was completed in 2012 by Kasgro Railcar for Westinghouse Nuclear and is used in North America primarily to transport reactor containment vessels. It has 36 axles (18 for each half). Each half contains nine trucks which are connected by a complex system of span bolsters. WECX 801 has the ability to shift its load  vertically and up to  laterally on either side of the car's center line. The train's speed is limited to  when WECX 801 is empty, but only  when loaded and requires a crew of six operators in addition to the train's crew.

CEBX 800 in North America 
The second largest Schnabel car in service, owned by  ABB, bears the CEBX 800 registration, and is used in North America. Built by Krupp AG, it has 36 axles (18 for each half). Each half has 9 bogies linked together by a complex system of span bolsters.

History 

The word Schnabel is from German , meaning "carrying-beak-wagon", because of the usually tapered shape of the lifting arms, resembling a bird's beak.

In World War II the German  used Schnabel cars for transporting the  heavy-calibre (54 cm and 60 cm calibre) siege mortars. These were self-propelled with a continuous-track suspension chassis of substantial length to maneuver into a firing position over a short range, but depended on a pair of purpose-designed Schnabel cars for long-range transport by rail. The same system was also used at the same time for the rail transport of the French FCM 2C super-heavy armoured fighting vehicle.

In the United States, the first Schnabel car, WECX 200, was built for Westinghouse Nuclear by manufacturer Greenville Steel Car in the 1960s.

Patent history

The Schnabel design was covered under US patent #US 4041879A

List of selected Schnabel wagons 

The Class Uaai low-loading wagon with special equipment is marketed Europe-wide exclusively by the heavy load department, Heavy Cargo + Service, of Nuclear Cargo + Service.

See also 
 Class U special wagon

References

Further reading

  (additional technical details on CEBX 800)
  (boxcar comparison figures)
  (details on CEBX 800)
  (basic definition of a Schnabel car)

External links

 Schnabel cars – photos and technical information on Schnabel cars used worldwide.
 Heavy Rail Transport Basics

Freight rolling stock